Jonathan Sprout (born John Wells Sprout, Jr. on April 12, 1952 in Hightstown, New Jersey, United States) is an American songwriter, performer and recording artist from Pennsylvania, US.  He has released twelve albums, many of which feature children's music.  Sprout has performed more than 6,500 concerts and taught more than 800 songwriting workshops throughout the United States. In 1994, Sprout began a 20-year stint researching, writing, and recording songs about American heroes. This resulted in four albums that received 26 national awards including a GRAMMY® nomination in the Best Children’s Album category. In 2010 his ninth album, American Heroes #3, was nominated for a Grammy Award in the "Best Music for Children" category.

Biography
Sprout grew up in Hightstown, New Jersey. His high school years were spent at the Peddie School in Hightstown; Sprout developed his interest in music while attending Bucknell University in Lewisburg, Pennsylvania.  He was a member of the Tau Kappa Epsilon fraternity, participated in competitive swimming, and was a member of Cap and Dagger, the campus theatre organization.  He played small acting parts in Marat Sade, The Alchemist and The Wizard of Oz. Sprout received his B.A. in psychology from Bucknell in 1974.

During the years immediately following college, he performed regularly in the ski resort of Killington, Vermont; in Estes Park, Colorado; and in Lake Placid, New York. His first album, "Angel's Everywhere" (Green Mountain Records, 1978) was a production of original writings from those years. In 1979, he formed the band "Light" to promote his new original work.

Sprout’s personal life reflects the values his creative work espouses. An active member of the Religious Society of Friends, known as Quakers, he resides in Bryn Gweled, an intentional community outside Philadelphia, dedicated to championing compassionate and responsible shared living. Sprout’s plug-in hybrid car and energy- efficient home and studio are powered by solar panels, enabling him to live and travel virtually off the utility and electric grid.

Career

Early career 
In 1986, Sprout co-produced the first of four albums with recording engineer and guitarist Leslie Chew. Their On the Radio was the second album of rock music for children ever made in America. In 1990, Sprout Recordings released Lullabies for a New Age, the first album of original New Age music ever recorded for children. 

In 1991, Sprout utilized his degree in psychology, releasing another album, Kid Power, created to boost children’s self-esteem. Dr. Music followed in 1994 with a title track that for sev-eral months stayed in the top 10 on Radio AHHS, America’s syndicated radio station for children.

American heroes 
In 1994, Sprout began a 20-year stint researching, writing, and recording songs about American heroes. This resulted in four albums that garnered a 26 national awards, including a Grammy  nomination in the Best Children’s Album category. Sprout wrote a tribute to John Muir because he co-wrote a song about him that appears on my Grammy nominated American Heroes #3 CD.

Force For Good 
In 2016, concerned by current national and global events yet inspired by the heroes he had written about, Sprout founded Force For Good to uplift, unify, inspire, energize, and engage people in responsible civic duties.

Sprout worked with co-producer Joe Mennonna for two years, orchestrating 24 original music pieces. He worked two more years creating films for each piece of music with Emmy-winning filmmaker Rodney Whittenberg. Force For Good’s songs and films address important issues, including sensible gun control, immigration reform, climate change, renewable energy, hunger, homelessness, and racial and gender equality.

Force For Good will release one film each month, beginning in January 2020 with Ice, a piece about the melting of the polar ice caps and the effects of climate change. The Force For Good audio CD Passions will be released February 2020 followed by Innocence, slated to debut February 2021. The Passions CD debuted on the February ZMR Top 100 Charts at #4, and placed #2 on the March Top 100 charts. The film “Safe” (about sensible gun regulation) is a Finalist in the Independent Shorts Awards.

Discography 
 Angels Everywhere (Green Mount Records, 1978)
 A Light in the Night (Sprout Recordings, 1984)
 On the Radio (Sprout Records, 1986)
 Lullabies for a New Age (Sprout Recordings, 1991)
 Kid Power (Sprout Recordings, 1991)
 Dr. Music (Sprout Recordings, 1994)
 More American Heroes (Sprout Records, 2000)
 American Heroes (Sprout Records, 2006)
 American Heroes #3 (Sprout Recordings, 2009)
 American Heroes #4 (Sprout Recordings, 2014)
 Passions (Sprout Recordings, 2020)

References

External links
 
 

1952 births
Living people
Children's songwriters
Songwriters from Pennsylvania
Songwriters from New Jersey
Bucknell University alumni
Musicians from New Jersey
Peddie School alumni
People from Hightstown, New Jersey